Ernest Dye (born July 15, 1971) is a former offensive guard in the National Football League (NFL). He was drafted by the Phoenix Cardinals in the first round of the 1993 NFL Draft.

In August 1999, Dye along with teammates Carl Simpson and Lester Holmes, was involved in a severe car crash that cost Dye the use of his right arm, ending his career.

References

1971 births
Living people
American football offensive guards
American football offensive tackles
Phoenix Cardinals players
Arizona Cardinals players
Itawamba Indians football players
St. Louis Rams players
South Carolina Gamecocks football players
People from Greenwood, South Carolina
Ed Block Courage Award recipients